"Feels Like Woah" is the second single from Wes Carr's second studio album, The Way the World Looks. It was released on 7 March 2009 and has been used as the theme song for the 2009 NRL season.

Track listing

Music video

A music video was created and released for the song. It was filmed in Sydney's inner-west suburbs. On March 4, 2009 the music video was released when uploaded to Carr's official YouTube channel.

Chart performance
"Feels Like Woah" debuted at #46 on the ARIA Top Singles chart because some record stores sold the single a week early. Feels Like Woah reached a peak of #14.

Charts

End of Year Charts

Certifications

References

2009 songs
Wes Carr songs
Songs written by Adam Argyle
Songs written by Wes Carr
Sony BMG singles